Dicata odhneri is a species of sea slug, specifically an aeolid nudibranch, a marine gastropod mollusc in the family Facelinidae.

Distribution
This species was described from the Gulf of Naples, Italy. It has been reported from Atlantic Coasts of Europe as far north as Lough Hyne in southern Ireland.

References

Facelinidae
Gastropods described in 1967